Maurice Beauchamp is a retired politician in Montreal, Quebec, Canada. He served on the Montreal city council from 1994 to 2005, representing Saint-Sulpice as a member of Vision Montreal.

Early career
Beauchamp is a horticulturalist. He was an employee of the Montreal Botanical Garden for three decades and in this capacity worked closely with its director, Pierre Bourque, who was subsequently the founder of Vision Montreal.

City councillor
Bourque administration
Beauchamp was first elected to Montreal city council in the 1994 municipal election, defeating incumbent Michael Benoit in Saint-Sulpice. Vision Montreal won a council majority in this election under Bourque's leadership, and, when the new council met in November 1994, Bourque appointed Beauchamp to a six-month term as deputy mayor. In February 1997, he appointed Beauchamp as president of the city's administration and services committee.

Vision Montreal won a second consecutive council majority in the 1998 municipal election. Beauchamp, who was re-elected in Saint-Sulpice, was appointed as an associate member of the Montreal executive committee in November 1998. He was also named as municipal ombudsman, a position that Bourque had established in 1994. Beauchamp's 1998 ombudsman's report requested that the office have an independent budget and be formally recognized in Montreal's city charter.

Tremblay administration
Beauchamp was elected to a third term in 2001, as Gérald Tremblay's Montreal Island Citizens Union (MICU) won a majority on council. Beauchamp stood down as ombudsman and served for the next four years as a member of the opposition. By virtue of his position on city council, he also served on the Ahuntsic-Cartierville borough council.

As a member of city's transport committee, Beauchamp called for a smoking ban in city taxis in 2003.

Beauchamp ran for borough mayor of Ahuntsic-Cartierville in the 2005 election and was defeated by MICU candidate Marie-Andrée Beaudoin. A newspaper report from the campaign identified him as seventy-three years old.

Electoral record

References

Living people
Montreal city councillors
People from Ahuntsic-Cartierville
Year of birth missing (living people)
Place of birth missing (living people)